Ordos International Circuit, built in 2010, is a motorsport facility located in Kangbashi New Area, Ordos City, Inner Mongolia, China. It hosted a round of the China Touring Car Championship, Scirocco Cup China and Superleague Formula in 2010.

History

Jiang Tengyi was the first driver to win a race at Ordos, when he won round 1 of the China Touring Car Championship at the wheel of a Ford Focus.

Ben Hanley became the first driver to win an international race at Ordos on 3 October 2010 when he won the first of two Superleague Formula races held here for Olympiacos.

Ordos was included in the 2011 FIA GT1 World Championship calendar by the FIA on 10 December 2010. Marc VDS Racing's Maxime Martin and Frederic Makowiecki secured their third qualifying race victory of the year. The team then secured its first championship race win in the World GT1 series as Maxime Martin and Frederic Makowiecki held JRM Nissan duo Richard Westbrook and Peter Dumbreck at bay.

Lap records

The official fastest race lap records at the Ordos International Circuit are listed as:

Notes

References

External links
 Official website
 Map and circuit history at RacingCircuits.info

Motorsport venues in Inner Mongolia
Sports venues in Inner Mongolia
Buildings and structures in Ordos City